Several vehicles were used by the hijackers of the September 11 attacks. Reports by the FBI and other agencies and press accounts provide details of some of these automobiles.

Mohamed Atta's Nissan Altima

Khalid al-Mihdhar and Nawaf al-Hazmi's Toyota Corolla 
In early February 2000, hijackers Khalid al-Mihdhar and Nawaf al-Hazmi rented an apartment at the Parkwood Apartments complex in the Clairemont Mesa area of San Diego, and Mihdhar purchased a used blue four-door 1988 Toyota Corolla Deluxe sedan with VIN # JT2AE92E9J3137546, California license plate 3JFZ283.  This car would be used from shortly after the arrival of the first hijackers in San Diego and driven across the continent to Arizona and Oklahoma to Virginia, Connecticut, and other locations on the east coast of the US until it was found at Dulles Airport with items indicating that it had been used in conjunction with preparations for the hijackings.

By May 2000, Mihdhar transferred his vehicle's registration to Hazmi. Hani Hanjour arrived in San Diego in early December 2000, joining Hazmi, but they soon left for Phoenix, Arizona where Hanjour could take refresher flight training.  On December 12, Hanjour and Hazmi signed a lease for an apartment in the Indian Springs Village complex in Mesa, Arizona. On April 1, while driving with Hani Hanjour, Al-Hazmi received a speeding ticket and a summons for failure to wear safety belt from the Oklahoma Highway Patrol. According to FBI reports, Al-Hazmi was driving the blue 1988 Toyota Corolla, though some reports state he was in a Chevrolet Impala. In April, they drove to the Dar al-Hijrah mosque in the Falls Church metropolitan Washington, DC area where Anwar al-Awlaki who they had previously met in San Diego was now the new imam, and Hanjour had specified as a forwarding address for his utility bills. It is thought that al-Awlaki introduced them to Eyad Alrababah who drove Hanjour to Fairfield, Connecticut on May 8, with Nawaf Al-Hazmi, vehicle with Moqed and Ahmed Alghamdi following in the Toyota.

Items seized from car 
After the 9/11 attacks at about 3:45 PM on 09/12/01, the Toyota was flagged as a suspicious vehicle at Dulles International Airport, and determined to be registered to Al-Hazmi of Lemon Grove, California. A search warrant was approved, and among the items seized were the following:

1) An hourly parking ticket dated and stamped 09/11/01 7:25 AM 
2) Four (4) color diagrams of an instrument panel for a B757 aircraft
3) One yellow and black utility knife (box cutter)
4) One Pan Am International Flight Academy, Jet Tech International, Phoenix, AZ, identification card in the name of HANI HANJOUR
5) A cashier's check to the Flight Academy in the amount of $5745 from HANJOUR
6) A travel itinerary for seats 13A and 13B for KHALID AL-MIHDHAR and MAJED MOQED on AA Flight 77
7) A piece of paper with the name "Osama 5895316"
8) Packing slip of package sent by Rawf Al Dog, 1565 Washington Boulevard, #8, Laurel Maryland... to the United Arab Emirates on 09/10/01 at 6:57 AM
9) A checkbook with partially written checks...
10) ..
17) One spiral notebook containing handwritten Arabic notes and telephone number ....
27) A hand drawn map of a neighborhood that appears to be 8541 Mount Vernon Avenue Lemon Grove California
28) ...
29) California vehicle registration for XXX San Diego California

The FBI was advised that the package was not delivered. It was checked by a bomb squad, and was found to contain a note written in Arabic and a check card to the wife or girlfriend of Al-Hazmi expressing his love stating that enclosed money was for her benefit.

References

September 11 attacks